The men's decathlon event at the 1999 All-Africa Games was held 14–15 September at the Johannesburg Stadium.

Results

References

Decathlon